The phonological system of the Hejazi Arabic consists of approximately 26 to 28 native consonant phonemes and 8 vowel phonemes: , in addition to 2 diphthongs: . Consonant length and vowel length are both distinctive in Hejazi.

Strictly speaking, there are two main groups of dialects spoken in the Hejaz region, one by the urban population  originally spoken in the cities of Jeddah, Medina and Mecca where they constitute the majority and partially in Ta'if, and another dialect spoken by the Bedouin or rural populations which is also currently spoken as well in the mentioned cities. However, the term most often applies to the urban variety which is discussed in this article.

 phonemes will be (written inside slashes ) and allophones (written inside brackets ).

Consonants 
Hejazi consonant inventory depends on the speaker. Most speakers use 26 consonants with no interdental phonemes  or 28 phonemes, with the phonemes   and   being used partially due to the influence of Modern Standard Arabic and neighboring dialects, in addition to the marginal phoneme  and two foreign phonemes  ⟨پ⟩ and  ⟨ڤ⟩ used by a number of speakers. Being a Semitic language, the four emphatic consonants  are treated as separate phonemes from their plain counterparts.

Phonetic notes:

the classicized  is an optional allophone for ⟨ظ⟩.
  has the velar allophone , which occurs before velar consonants   as in  [aŋkab] ('it spilled') and  [mɪŋɡal] ('brazier').
the foreign phonemes  ⟨پ⟩ and  ⟨ڤ⟩ which exist only in loanwords, are used by a number of speakers and can be substituted by  ⟨ب⟩ and  ⟨ف⟩ respectively.
The two allophones might contrast for a number of speakers, e.g. ('horns') vs.   ('centuries') which might suggest  as a marginal phoneme.

Illustrative words 

3 also pronounced  instead of  depending on the speaker.
4 also pronounced  instead of  depending on the speaker.

Glottal Stop 
The glottal stop   was lost early on in the Old Hejazi Arabic period. In the initial position, the glottal stop's phonemic value is debatable and most words that begin with a glottal stop according to Classical Arabic orthography can be analyzed as beginning with a vowel rather than a glottal stop.

Gemination 
Long (geminate or double) consonants are pronounced exactly like short consonants; they occur between vowels and they are marked with a shaddah if needed, e.g. كَتَّب  or  kattab "he made (someone) write" vs. كَتَب  katab "he wrote". They can also occur phonemically at the end of words but are pronounced as a single consonant, not geminated, e.g. فَمّ  ('mouth') which is pronounced with a single final consonant .

Assimilation 

Dental Assimilation 

Notes:

 is a distinct phoneme, not a merger, e.g. ظَنّ  ('he thought') vs. زَنّ  ('he nagged').
 is an allophone for  based on spelling pronunciation, not a distinct phoneme.
Both common and spelling pronunciations are used in Hejazi, sometimes even by the same speaker.

The partial merger between the phonemes has led to some homophones that did not exist in Modern Standard Arabic e.g.

This phenomenon might be due to the influence of Modern Standard Arabic and neighboring dialects.

Vowels 

The main phonological feature that differentiates urban Hejazi from the neighboring dialects of the Arabian peninsula and the Levant is the constant use of full vowels and absence of vowel reduction (use of the schwa ).

However, they are still preserved in many words such as   'animal', and have resurfaced in a number of words borrowed later from Modern Standard Arabic. This created a contrast with the inherited monophthongized words as in inherited   'my voice' vs. borrowed   'acoustic', and inherited   'my eye' vs. borrowed   'ophthalmic'. Not all instances of mid vowels are a result of monophthongization — some are from grammatical processes   'they said' →   'they said to her' (opposed to Classical Arabic   ), and some occur in portmanteau words e.g. 'why?' (from Classical Arabic   'for what' and   'thing'). 

The pronunciation of word initial and medial  and  depends on the nature of the surrounding consonants, whether the syllable is stressed or unstressed, the accent of the speaker, and rate of speech.

Phonetic notes:

 short  (also analyzed as ) has two main pronunciations:
lax  or less likely  in word initial or medial syllables, e.g.
tense  at the end of words or before  or when isolate, although short  can occur at the end of a foreign word but that depends on the speaker's knowledge of the foreign language.
short  (also analyzed as ) has two main pronunciations: 
lax  or less likely  in word initial or medial syllables, e.g.
tense  at the end of words or before  or when isolate, although short  can occur at the end of a foreign word but that depends on the speaker's knowledge of the foreign language.

Phonological processes 
The linking conjunction  ('and') pronounced [u] is often linked with the consonant (before it) or the vowel (before or after it) or for emphasis only left as-is :-
 ِ  ('me and you') is either pronounced as [anaw e̞nti], where [u] is connected to the vowel before it, or pronounced as [ana wɪnti], where [u] is connected to the vowel after it, or left as-is for emphasis [ana u e̞nti].
   ('fifty one') is either pronounced [waːħe̞du xamsiːn] or for emphasis [waːħe̞d u xamsiːn].
   ('seventy five') is either pronounced [] or for emphasis [].

Vowel Shortening 
Medial vowel shortening occurs before indirect object pronouns (e.g.), where a medial word long vowel (⟨ي⟩ ,⟨ا⟩ and ⟨و⟩) in verbs is shortened. For example,  /ʕaːd/ "he repeated" becomes  /ʕadlahum/ "he repeated to them" and  "going to him" is pronounced /raːjħinlu/ with a shortened /i/ and rarely /raːjħiːnlu/. This can also affect the spelling of the words depending on the writer, e.g.  becomes  without the long vowel or it can be written  but this does not effect third person masculine past verbs as in the example below.

Vowel shortening also occurs only in few words as in جاي "I'm coming" pronounced /d͡ʒaj/ or /d͡ʒaːj/.

Vowel lengthening 
Most word-final long vowels from the Classical period have been shortened in Hejazi but they are lengthened when suffixed, as in   "they call" →    "they call her".

References

Bibliography 

 
 
 

Phonology
Arabic phonology